Erik-Reger-Preis was a literary prize of Germany from 1999 to 2009.
1999 Ernst-Wilhelm Händler
2001 Mark Siemons 
2003 Uwe Timm
2005 Peter Rühmkorf
2007 Ralf Rothmann

German literary awards